Shorea pubistyla is a species of plant in the family Dipterocarpaceae. It is endemic to Borneo, and occurs in Sarawak and west Kalimantan.

References

pubistyla
Endemic flora of Borneo
Trees of Borneo
Taxonomy articles created by Polbot

Least concern plants